Seasonal spread traders are spread traders that take advantage of seasonal patterns by holding long and short positions in futures contracts simultaneously in the same or a related commodity markets, such as the Chicago Mercantile Exchange, the New York Mercantile Exchange and the London Metal Exchange among others.  

The spread is the difference between the simultaneous values of these futures contracts.

The 4 main commodity groups are:

 Energetic, where you can find gasoil and natural gas.
 Metals, such as gold, silver and copper.
 Tropicals, like coffee, cocoa, cotton and sugar.
 Grains and Meat, including lean hogs, corn, soybeans, etc.

Traders may use a combination of fundamental analysis, technical, and historical factors in their analysis.  Speculators hope to profit from the relative changes in price between the initial and offsetting positions.  Contracts may be spread against different months or different markets. 

Traders are concerned with whether the changes in the difference between the sides of the spread are moving in their favor or not.  Position traders may hold trades longer and with less risk using spreads.

In order to find the information on seasonal spread, many traders use algorithms  retrieving past commodity volatility and performance. 

Important sources for seasonal traders are institutional reports, such as the COT report, which shows the positions held on commodities by the major market players.

Lower good faith margin deposits required by commodity exchanges to trade spreads means more opportunities to leverage up and diversify positions.  Spreads may behave smoother than the underlying futures contracts.

A crucial point whether seasonal spread trading works is the quality of the seasonal pattern.
It is important to keep checking the recurring price trends because trends can also change. For example, there was a very good seasonal pattern in gold in the 80s and 90s that no longer exists. The reason is a different demand behavior of gold buyers. Despite the fact that seasonal patterns can change, investing and trading based on seasonal patterns is very popular in the financial industry. Financial institutions use professional software for this purpose, such as Seasonal Analysis Tools.

See also 
 Speculation
 Jesse Livermore

References

External links
 Reminiscences of a Stock Operator by Edwin Lefèvre (best-selling biography of Jesse Livermore) multiple reissues, last in 2004
Futures Spread Trading by Steven A. Mitchell
Seasonality at futures market by SeasonAlgo
Detailed description for futures spread trading by SeasonAlgo

Commodity markets
Derivatives (finance)